The Church of St. Lucy is a Roman Catholic parish church under the authority of the Roman Catholic Archdiocese of New York, located at 833 Mace Avenue, Allerton, Bronx, New York City. The parish was established in 1927.

Lourdes of America 
Lourdes of America on Bronxwood Avenue is a stone grotto on the grounds of St. Lucy's built in 1939 as a replica of the Shrine at Lourdes.

References 

Christian organizations established in 1927
Roman Catholic churches completed in 1939
Roman Catholic churches in the Bronx
20th-century Roman Catholic church buildings in the United States